Dundalk entered the 1975–76 season on the back of a fifth-place finish the previous season. 1975–76 was Jim McLaughlin's first full season as manager, having replaced John Smith in November 1974. It was Dundalk's 50th consecutive season in the top tier of Irish football.

Season summary
The previous season had seen manager John Smith quit only two matches into the league programme for a new job outside football. Smith's resignation paved the way for the appointment of Jim McLaughlin as player-manager on 20 November 1974. But the Dundalk board that had taken control of the club in the summer of 1973 had already exhausted its available funding, and McLaughlin had been obliged to see what could be salvaged of the season with Smith's squad. His fifth-place finish was seen as "creditable", given the decline in the club's fortunes since the previous League title win in 1966–67. Going into the new season, he retained the players who had impressed, and signed a number of players who had been on the fringe at their clubs or were coming from non-League sides – reflecting the limited budget he was operating under.

The season opened with the League Cup in September, and McLaughlin's new side were knocked out in the second round. Louth rivals Drogheda United knocked them out of the Leinster Cup in the first round. The league schedule got under way on 5 October 1975, and saw a number of formerly successful clubs, such as Waterford, Cork Celtic and Cork Hibernians, all bring in fading stars from England – Bobby Charlton, George Best, Geoff Hurst and Rodney Marsh – in a bid to entice back the support they had lost as their fortunes had ebbed. Meanwhile, Dundalk, needing no circus acts, were soon in a two-way tussle with Finn Harps at the top of the table. Struggling for goals early on, the signing of Terry Flanagan from Bohemians in November, after what would be their only defeat of the season, allowed them to press on. A 2–0 victory in a top of the table clash away to Finn Harps in February, in which Flanagan scored both goals, saw Dundalk go clear in the table. They were knocked out in the first round of the FAI Cup a week later, but they dropped only two points in the League subsequently, before clinching the title by beating Cork Hibernians at home in front of a packed Oriel Park with a game to spare.

First-Team Squad (1975–76)
Sources:

Competitions

League Cup
Source:
First round

Dundalk won 6–1 on aggregate
Second round

Leinster Senior Cup
Source:
First Round

FAI Cup
Source:
First Round

League
Source:

League table

Awards

Player of the Month

References
Bibliography

Citations

External links
Dundalk F.C. on YouTube

Dundalk F.C. seasons
Dundalk